DXAM (103.1 FM), broadcasting as 103.1 Click Radio, is a radio station owned by Hypersonic Broadcasting Center and operated by Click General Merchandise. The station's studio is located at the Bolo-Chavez Bldg., South Montilla Blvd. cor. Noli Me Tangere St., Brgy. Diego Silang, Butuan, while its transmitter is located at Purok 8, Sitio Bangkaling, Brgy. Nongnong, Butuan.

History
The station was established in 2013 as Sunny FM under the management of Almont and Blue Waters Group of Companies. It aired a soft adult contemporary format. On November 5, 2019, it went off the air for operating without a business permit.

On January 18, 2021, it went back on air as Click Radio under the management of Click General Merchandise, a local establishment owned by Mr. Jerry Ytac. It also became a part of the Radyo Serbato network and switched to a news and music format.

References

Radio stations established in 2013
Radio stations in Butuan